Shalivet (also Romanized as Shalīvet and Sheleyvāt; also known as Shīlīvāt, Shiliwath, Showleyvat, Showleyvet, and Showlivet) is a village in Jarahi Rural District, in the Central District of Mahshahr County, Khuzestan Province, Iran. At the 2006 census, its population was 149, in 26 families.

References 

Populated places in Mahshahr County